A blowtorch (known as a blowlamp in the UK), is a fuel-burning tool used for applying flame and heat to various applications, usually metalworking.

Blowtorch may refer to:

Tools
A cutting torch used for cutting metal, often used to mean any oxy-fuel welding and cutting torch
A certain application for a blowpipe

Other uses
A powerful radio station, especially a clear channel broadcaster
Blowtorch (G.I. Joe), a fictional character in the G.I. Joe universe

See also
Blo.Torch, a melodic death metal band from The Hague, Netherlands
Blo.Torch (album), a 1999 album by the band